Sunpasitthiprasong Hospital is the main hospital of Ubon Ratchathani Province, Thailand, and is classified under the Ministry of Public Health as a regional hospital. It has a CPIRD Medical Education Center which trains doctors of the Faculty of Medicine, Khon Kaen University and the College of Medicine and Public Health, Ubon Ratchathani University.

History 
Following the revolution of 1932, the cabinet led a policy to expand medical services to rural parts of Thailand and to establish hospitals in provinces adjacent to the Mekong River: Nong Khai, Nakhon Phanom and Ubon Ratchathani. Mom Chao Upasisan Chumphon also donated a piece of 27 rai land for construction of a hospital only. The hospital opened as Ubon Ratchathani Hospital and was renamed to Sunpasitthiprasong Hospital in honour of Prince Sunpasitthiprasong, father of Mom Chao Upasisan and former governor of Monthon Isan.

Since 1995, the hospital became affiliated to the Faculty of Medicine, Khon Kaen University and trains students in the Collaborative Project to Increase Production of Rural Doctor (CPIRD). This was extended to the College of Medicine and Public Health, Ubon Ratchathani University on 3 September 2003.

See also 

 Healthcare in Thailand
 Hospitals in Thailand
 List of hospitals in Thailand

References 

 Article incorporates material from the corresponding article in the Thai Wikipedia.

Hospitals in Thailand
Ubon Ratchathani province